Buffelshoek Pass (English: Buffalo's Corner) is situated in the Eastern Cape, province of South Africa on the Regional road R337 (Eastern Cape), between Pearston and Cradock.

Mountain passes of the Eastern Cape